The Ahmadnagar Sultanate was a late medieval Indian Muslim kingdom located in the northwestern Deccan, between the sultanates of Gujarat and Bijapur, ruled by the Nizam Shahi or Bahri dynasty. Malik Ahmed, the Bahmani governor of Junnar after defeating the Bahmani army led by general Jahangir Khan on 28 May 1490 declared independence and established the Nizam Shahi dynasty rule over the sultanate of Ahmednagar. Initially his capital was in the town of Junnar with its fort, later renamed Shivneri. In 1494, the foundation was laid for the new capital Ahmadnagar. In 1636 Aurangzeb, then Mugal viceroy of Deccan, finally annexed the sultanate to the Mughal Empire.

Ahmednagar sultanate was dependent on Koli chieftains for military or soldiers. Koli chieftains of provided the cavalry and infantry for Sultans of Ahmednagar during wartimes.

History

Establishment
Malik Ahmad Nizam Shah I was the son of Nizam-ul-Mulk Malik Hasan Bahri, originally a Hindu Brahmin from Beejanuggar (or Bijanagar) originally named Timapa. Ahmed's father was made Malik Na'ib on the death of Mahmud Gavan and was appointed Prime Minister by Mahmood Shah Bahmani II.  Soon after, he appointed Ahmed governor of Beed and other districts in the vicinity of Dowlutabad. After the death of his father, Ahmed assumed the titles of Nizam ul-Mulk Bahri from his father, the last signifying a falcon as Hasan had been falconer to the Sultan. Malik Ahmad the Bahmani governor of Junnar defended his province against incursions from the Sultan, successfully defeating a much larger army led by Sheikh Mowullid Arab in a night attack , an army of 18,000 led by Azmut ul-Mulk and an army led by bahmani general Jahangir Khan on 28 May 1490 declared independence and established the Nizam Shahi dynasty rule over the sultanate of Ahmednagar. Initially his capital was in the town of Junnar with its fort, later renamed Shivneri. In 1494, the foundation was laid for the new capital Ahmadnagar. After several attempts, he secured the great fortress of Daulatabad in 1499.

Reigns of the successors of Malik Ahmad

After the death of Malik Ahmad in 1510, his son Burhan Nizam Shah I, a boy of seven was, installed in his place. In the initial days of his reign, the control of the kingdom was in the hands of Mukammal Khan, an Ahmadnagar official and his son. Burhan converted to Shi'i Islam under the tutelage of Shah Tahir Husaini. Burhan died in Ahmadnagar in 1553. He left six sons, of whom Hussain Nizam Shah I succeeded him. Aliya Rama Raya emperor of vijayanagara made a series of aggressive efforts to maintain hold over Kalyan and diplomatic dealings with the Sultanates laden with insulting gestures, the four Muslim Sultanates – Hussain Nizam Shah I and Ali Adil Shah I of Ahmadnagar and Bijapur to the west, Ali Barid Shah I of Bidar in the center, and Ibrahim Quli Qutb Shah Wali of Golkonda to the east – united in the wake of shrewd marital diplomacy and convened to attack Aliya Rama Raya, in late January 1565 at talikota. Hussain was a leading figurehead of the Deccan Sultanates during the Battle of Talikota.after the battle Rama Raya was beheaded by Sultan Nizam Hussain himself.

After the death of Hussain in 1565, his minor son Murtaza Nizam Shah I ascended the throne. During his minority, his mother Khanzada Humayun Sultana ruled as a regent for several years. Murtaza Shah annexed Berar in 1572. On his death in 1588, his son Miran Hussain ascended the throne. But his reign could last only a little more than ten months as he was poisoned to death. Ismail, a cousin of Miran Hussain was raised to the throne, but the actual power was in the hands of Jamal Khan, the leader of the Deccani/Habshi group in the court. Jamal Khan was killed in the battle of Rohankhed in 1591 and soon Ismail Shah was also captured and confined by his father Burhan, who ascended the throne as Burhan Nizam Shah II. But his sister Chand Bibi fought him. Winning the kingdom, Chand Bibi ascended the throne as regent for the new infant sultan, Bahadur Nizam Shah. She repulsed an invasion by the Mughal Empire with the reinforcements from the Bijapur and Golconda Sultanates. After the death of Chand Bibi in July 1600, Ahmadnagar was conquered by the Mughals and the Sultan was imprisoned.

Malik Ambar and the demise of the sultanate

Although, Ahmadnagar city and its adjoining areas were occupied by the Mughals, an extensive part of the kingdom still remained in possession of the influential officials of the Nizam Shahi dynasty. Malik Ambar and other Ahmadnagar officials defied the Mughals and declared Murtaza Nizam Shah II as sultan in 1600 at a new capital Paranda. Malik Ambar became prime minister and Vakil-us-Saltanat of Ahmadnagar. Later, the capital was shifted first to Junnar and then to a new city Khadki (later Aurangabad).

After the death of Malik Ambar in May 1626, his son Fath Khan surrendered to the Mughals in 1633 and handed over the young Nizam Shahi ruler Hussain Shah, who was sent as a prisoner to the fort of Gwalior. But soon, Shahaji with the assistance of  Bijapur, placed an infant scion of the Nizam Shahi dynasty, Murtaza Nizam Shah III on the throne and he became the regent. In 1636 Aurangzeb, then Mughal viceroy of Deccan finally annexed the sultanate to the Mughal empire after defeating Shahaji.

Revenue system of Malik Ambar
The revenue system introduced by Malik Ambar was based on the revenue system introduced in Northern India and some parts of Gujarat and Khandesh subahs by Raja Todarmal. Lands were classified as good or bad according to their fertility and he took a number of years to ascertain accurately the average yield of lands. He abolished the revenue farming. At first, revenue was fixed as two-fifths of the actual produce in kind, but later the cultivators were allowed to pay in cash equivalent to approximately one-third of the yield. Although an average rent was fixed for each plot of land but actual collections depended on the conditions of crops and they varied from year to year.

Art and architecture 
Under the reigns of successive rulers of the dynasty, architecture and art flourished in the kingdom. The earliest extant school of painting in the Deccan sultanates is from Ahmadnagar. Several palaces, such as the Farah Bakhsh Bagh, the Hasht Bihisht Bagh, Lakkad Mahal were built, as were tombs, mosques and other buildings. Many forts of the Deccan, such as the fort of Junnar (later renamed Shivneri), Paranda, Ausa, Dharur, Lohagad, etc. were greatly improved under their reign. Daulatabad, which was their secondary capital, was also heavily fortified and constructed in their reign. Literature was heavily patronised in the kingdom, as seen through manuscripts such as the Tarif-i Husain Shah Badshah-i Dakan. Sanskrit scholarship was also given a boost under their rule, as demonstrated by the works of Sabaji Pratap and Bhanudatta. The city of Ahmadnagar, founded by the Nizam Shahs, was described as being comparable to Cairo and Baghdad, within a few years of its construction. It was modelled along the great cities of the Persianate world, given the Shi'i leanings of the dynasty.

List of rulers 

The following is the list of the Nizam Shahi rulers of Ahmadnagar:
Ahmad Nizam Shah I (1490–1510)
Burhan Nizam Shah I (1510–1553)
Hussain Nizam Shah I (1553–1565)
Murtaza Nizam Shah I (1565–1588)
Hussain Nizam Shah II (1588–1589)
Ismail Nizam Shah (1589–1591)
Burhan Nizam Shah II (1591–1595)
Bahadur Nizam Shah (1595–1600; under the regency of his great aunt Chand Bibi)
Ahmad Nizam Shah II (1596)
Murtaza Nizam Shah II (1600–1610)
Burhan Nizam Shah III (1610–1631)
Hussain Nizam Shah III (1631–1633)
Murtaza Nizam Shah III (1633–1636)
Mughal historians and Emperors never referred to them as Nizam Shahs but rather as Nizam-ul-Mulk, since they were not recognised as equals.

Lineage

Notes

References

Further reading
 Shyam, Radhe (2008). Kingdom of Ahmadnagar, Delhi: Motilal Banarsidass, 
 Sohoni, Pushkar (2010). "Local Idioms and Global Designs: Architecture of the Nizam Shahs" (Doctoral dissertation, University of Pennsylvania).
 Sohoni, Pushkar(2015), Aurangabad with Daulatabad, Khuldabad and Ahmadnagar, Mumbai : Jaico Publishing House; London : Deccan Heritage Foundation,  
 Chopra, R.M. (2012), The Rise, Growth And Decline in Indo-Persian Literature, Iran Culture House, New Delhi, Chapter on "Persian Literature in Ahmadnagar Sultanate".

States and territories established in 1490
States and territories disestablished in 1636
 
Islamic rule in the Indian subcontinent
History of Aurangabad, Maharashtra
Former sultanates
History of Maharashtra
Indian monarchs by empires